Macrauzata minor is a moth in the family Drepanidae first described by Okano in 1959. It is found in Taiwan.

The wingspan is 45–52 mm.

The larvae feed on the leaves of Castanopsis formosana and Quercus variabilis. Mature larvae curl the leaf tip and fix it with silk to pupate inside.

References

Moths described in 1959
Drepaninae